Mission San Jose High School (MSJHS or MSJ) is a four-year co-educational public high school founded in 1964. It is located in the Mission San Jose district of Fremont, California, United States. It is one of five comprehensive high schools in the Fremont Unified School District. Mission San Jose High School is the third largest high school in Fremont.

Academics 
In 2022, U.S. News & World Report ranked Mission San Jose High as the 94th best high school in the United States. The school was ranked 8th in California, with an Advanced Placement participation rate of 89%.

The school was named a National Blue Ribbon School in 1987, 1996, and 2008.

Students

Demographics 
As of the 2021-2022 school year, 91.1% of the students were Asian American, 4.3% were European American, 2.5% were Hispanic and 0.3% were African American. According to California School Dashboard, in 2017 MSJHS had 3.8% socioeconomically disadvantaged students and 3.1% English Learners out of its total population of 2003.

Extracurricular activities

Academic competitions

Quiz bowl-style tournaments 

In 2008, Mission San Jose's National Ocean Science Bowl Team placed first at the regional competition, advancing to the National Competition and placing second behind Lincoln-Sudbury Regional High School.

In 2015, Mission San Jose's Ocean Science Bowl team finished fourth in nationals; they attended nationals again in 2017.

In 2022, Mission San Jose’s Science Bowl team finished second in Nationals.

Speech and Debate 

In 2004–2005, Mission San Jose's Lincoln-Douglas Debate team (also known as OHSODEF) was ranked first in the country. The team won the National Tournament of Champions in 2003 and closed out (having two debaters meet in the final round of) the 2004 Fall Classic tournament at the Greenhill School.

Local (Bay Area) competitions 

At the Bay Area Science and Innovation Consortium WonderCup Challenge, MSJ has won in four years; three of those wins were in a row (2004–2006).

Go tournaments 

Mission San Jose's Go team took first place at the California High School Go Championships three years in a row (2005–2007).  In 2008, the MSJ Go club won first place in the Open Division to become the national champions. In 2010, Mission won first place in Division A at the newly formed Bay Area High School Go Tournament.

Chess tournaments 

In 2005, the team tied for first place at the CalNorthYouthChess regionals. In 2000, the team took first at the State Scholastic Championship.

Athletics 

Mission San Jose High School belongs to the Mission Valley Athletic League (MVAL), which comprises the five high schools in Fremont as well as Newark Memorial High School, the only high school in Newark. The MVAL is a league of the North Coast Section of the California Interscholastic Federation.

Mission High School's championships include badminton (2004-2017 NCS champions), tennis (2004, 2009, and 2021 NCS champions) and swimming (League champions for over 26 consecutive years).

In 2009, the boys' team won the NorCal Championships. The following fall, the girls' team had an 84-0 league individual record, first place in the MVAL team tournament, first and third place in the MVAL singles tournament, and a doubles sweep in the MVAL doubles tournament.

In the 2011 season, the girls' golf team placed second at NCS Championships and first at NorCal Championships. In the 2012 season, the team placed first at NCS Championships and third at Norcal Championships.

In the 1978 football season, the football team was the first in MVAL history to win the North Coast Section 4A Varsity Football Championship, going undefeated 12–0.  Michael Carnell rushed for a record 2,364 yards and 44  touchdowns in one season. The Warriors also produced former SF 49er and Super Bowl XXIX Champion Gary Plummer.

The team was disbanded following the 2015 season.

Mission's Winter Guard team won Champion status in the 2006 Novice Division competition against fifteen other guard units at Del Oro. The team also placed first at the 2011 NCBA Winterguard Championship at Del Oro in 2011, for the Intermediate Division. Most recently, the winter guard team placed third at the 2022 NCBA Winterguard Championship at Stockton in April of 2022 for the Scholastic Regional A Division.

The school colors are green and white and the mascot is the warrior. Its logo was the Mission Peak (a mountain easily visible from campus) until recently, when a new warrior logo was designed and implemented by student vote. The school's previous logo was a feathered arrow, but this was changed in the late 1990s in response to controversies surrounding the use of Native American mascots and symbols by American schools. Currently, the school designates the "Mission Man" as a mascot.

Notable alumni 

 Johnny Abrego (Class of 1981), former Major League Baseball pitcher
 Consuelo Maria Callahan (Class of 1968), Ninth Circuit Appeals Court Judge
 Natali Del Conte (Class of 1996), host of CNET's  Loaded
 Dina Ruiz-Eastwood (Class of 1983), television personality and ex-wife of Clint Eastwood
 Ryan Edwards (Class of 1994), former professional soccer player
 Scott Fisher (Class of 1981), former National Basketball League MVP player and coach, Australian Olympian
 Mic Gillette (Class of 1969), musician and former trumpeter for Tower of Power
 Don Hertzfeldt (Class of 1994), Academy Award-nominated animator
 Joe Krakoski (Class of 1981), former NFL linebacker
 Lev Kirshner (Class of 1987), soccer player and San Diego State University men's soccer coach
 Jake Kloberdanz (Class of 2001), OneHope Wine founder and CEO 
 Scot Marciel (Class of 1976), diplomat and current United States Ambassador to Burma (Myanmar)
 Joseph McVein (Class of 1974), former handball player; competed in the 1984 Summer Olympics and 1988 Summer Olympics
 Justin Medlock (Class of 2002), placekicker, Carolina Panthers
 Gary Plummer (Class of 1978), former NFL linebacker
 Kevin Sakuda  (Class of 1998), former soccer defender/midfielder
 Kevin Tan (Class of 2000), 2008 Beijing Olympics bronze medalist for men's team gymnastics
 Sid Sriram (Class of 2008), revered playback singer in Indian Films
 Cena Barhaghi (Class of 2009), designer and entrepreneur
 Kristi Yamaguchi (Class of 1989), Olympic figure skating gold medalist; champion of Dancing with the Stars season 6
 Pragathi Guruprasad (Class of 2016), playback singer and model, attended for 2 years
 Jason Oppenheim (Class of 1995), founder of The Oppenheim Group and cast member in Selling Sunset
 James Robert Rouse (Class of 1982), District Family Court Judge of the Second Circuit State of Hawaii
 Christine Chiu (Class of 2001), philanthropist, couture collector and co-founder of Beverly Hills Plastic Surgery inc., cast member in Bling Empire, in the thirtieth season of Dancing with the Stars.

References

External links 

 Mission San Jose High School website

Public high schools in California
1964 establishments in California
Educational institutions established in 1964
High schools in Alameda County, California
Schools in Fremont, California